The 1986 Individual Ice Speedway World Championship was the 21st edition of the World Championship  The Championship was held on ?, 1986 in Stockholm in Sweden.

The winner was Yuri Ivanov of the Soviet Union.

Classification

See also 
 1986 Individual Speedway World Championship in classic speedway
 1986 Team Ice Racing World Championship

References 

Ice speedway competitions
World